The Maine Department of Corrections is a state agency of Maine that is responsible for the direction and general administrative supervision, guidance and planning of both adult and juvenile correctional facilities and programs within the state. The agency has its headquarters in Augusta. As of January 2016, the Maine DOC had 2,223 inmates in its custody.

History 
In early 1823 the legislature authorized the construction of the first state prison. The facility was built in Thomaston atop the site of a limestone quarry.

Adult institutions 

 Bolduc Correctional Facility (inmate capacity 222)
 Mountain View Correctional Facility (inmate capacity 375)
 Maine Correctional Center (inmate capacity 662)
 Southern Maine Reentry Center (inmate capacity 64 Women)
 Maine State Prison (inmate capacity 916)
 Downeast Correctional Facility. Closed but under construction to house fifty residents for work release.
 Transitional Living Program about to be open for clients under probation supervision who receive assistance in housing and job searches.

Juvenile institutions 
The Division of Juvenile Services operates juvenile reformatories. The headquarters of the division is in the Elkins Building in Augusta.
Long Creek Youth Development Center (South Portland) - The Arthur R. Gould School (ARGS) is the educational program for the inmates.
It has both male and female inmates. It began receiving female inmates after the Stevens School closed in 1976. It was established  by the Maine Legislature in 1853 as the Boys Training Center.
Mountain View was closed to juveniles and all juveniles moved to Long Creek. It is now an adult facility.

See also

 List of law enforcement agencies in Maine
 List of United States state correction agencies
 List of U.S. state prisons
 Prison

References

External links
 Maine Department of Corrections

State law enforcement agencies of Maine
State corrections departments of the United States
Lists of United States state prisons
Prisons in Maine
Juvenile detention centers in the United States